Makaryev is a town and the administrative center of Makaryevsky District in Kostroma Oblast, Russia, located on the right bank of the Unzha River (Volga's tributary),  east of Kostroma, the administrative center of the oblast. Population:

History

In 1439, Makaryevo-Unzhensky monastery was founded on the territory of the modern town. Later, a sloboda grew around the monastery and was granted town status in 1778 under the name of Makaryev-na-Unzhe. By the end of the 19th century the name shortened to "Makaryev".

Administrative and municipal status
Within the framework of administrative divisions, Makaryev serves as the administrative center of Makaryevsky District. As an administrative division, it is, together with two rural localities, incorporated within Makaryevsky District as the town of district significance of Makaryev. As a municipal division, the town of district significance of Makaryev is incorporated within Makaryevsky Municipal District as Makaryev Urban Settlement.

References

Notes

Sources

Cities and towns in Kostroma Oblast
Makaryevsky District
Makaryevsky Uyezd (Kostroma Governorate)